Olimpiu Vasile Moruțan (born 25 April 1999) is a Romanian professional footballer who plays as an attacking midfielder or a winger for Serie B club Pisa, on loan from Süper Lig club Galatasaray, and the Romania national team.

A youth exponent of Universitatea Cluj, he recorded his debut for the seniors at the start of 2016. Moruțan went on to amass over 140 appearances in the top tier for Botoșani and FCSB combined in the following seasons, before moving abroad at age 22 to sign for Galatasaray in Turkey.

Internationally, Moruțan represented Romania under-21 at the 2021 UEFA European Championship. He then made his full debut for the country in October that year, in a 1–0 victory over Armenia.

Club career

Early career
Born in Cluj-Napoca and raised in Cătina, Moruțan joined the academy of Universitatea Cluj in 2008. At age 16, he played his first senior match for U Cluj in a 0–0 Liga II draw with Mioveni on 27 February 2016. On 16 April, he scored in a 1–3 away loss to Olimpia Satu Mare.

Moruțan moved to Botoșani in August 2016, making his Liga I debut on 15 October by coming on as a 74th-minute substitute in a 1–2 defeat at Pandurii Târgu Jiu. During early 2017, it was reported that FCSB, Atalanta and PSV Eindhoven were interested in acquiring him. Moruțan scored his first goal for the club—and in the top division—on 25 September 2017, in a 1–0 win over defending champions Viitorul Constanța.

FCSB
On 21 December 2017, FCSB agreed a deal in advance for the signing of Moruțan on a five-year contract from the start of the 2018–19 season. They reportedly paid a €700,000 transfer fee, while Botoșani retained 20% interest.

Moruțan made his debut on 21 July 2018, in a 0–1 Liga I defeat to Astra Giurgiu. Four days later, he played in his first European game, a 2–0 away success over Rudar Velenje in the UEFA Europa League second qualifying round. In the second leg in Bucharest on 2 August, he netted a goal after dribbling past several opponents and offered an assist as his team won 4–0, which earned him praise from owner George Becali. His first league goal came on 5 August, scoring the last in a 4–0 home win over Politehnica Iași. On 28 September, it was revealed that FCSB in truth paid €1 million for the player and that it recently acquired another 10% of the economic rights for €400,000.

Moruțan amassed 34 games in all competitions during his first year with the capital-based club, but started the majority of them on the bench. In the 2019–20 campaign he had poorer performances, which led Becali to criticise him heavily in the media. During mid-2020, Moruțan began to cement his place in the starting lineup, and in October scored one each in the successive 2–0 and 5–0 wins over Academica Clinceni and Hermannstadt, respectively.

On 13 March 2021, his headed goal helped to a 1–0 away defeat of UTA Arad, and six days later he netted in a 3–0 victory against title contenders CFR Cluj. FCSB ultimately lost the title as well as the postponed 2020 Supercupa României to the latter opponent, but Moruțan rose to prominence individually after totalling eight goals and eleven assists in the league. After an unsuccessful start to the 2021–22 season, the team dismissed its coach and he was again among the players targeted by the owner's criticism.

Galatasaray
On 23 August 2021, following protracted negotiations, the owner of FCSB announced that he accepted an offer worth €4.2 million plus €1.5 million in bonuses from Galatasaray for the transfer of Moruțan. Two days later, the Turkish club officially confirmed the signing of a five-year contract, but only reported a €3.5 million fee without mentioning add-ons.

Moruțan made his debut on the 29th that month in a 2–2 Süper Lig draw at Kasımpaşa, in which he assisted the opener of compatriot Alexandru Cicâldău and contributed to the second goal. On 26 September, he scored in a 2–1 success over Göztepe, and on 22 October provided an assist in a 1–0 victory over Lokomotiv Moscow in the Europa League group stage.

Loan to Pisa
On 4 August 2022, Serie B team Pisa paid €150,000 to loan Moruțan for one season. The Italian side has the option to sign him permanently for €5.5 million, and the full transfer becomes mandatory if some performance clauses are met.

Moruțan made his league debut on 13 August, providing two assists in a 3–4 loss to Cittadella, and the following fixture converted a penalty in a 2–2 draw with Como.

International career
Moruțan was selected by head coach Adrian Mutu for the 2021 UEFA European Under-21 Championship, playing in all three matches against the Netherlands, Hungary and Germany. He started in the 1–1 draw and the 2–1 victory against the former two, respectively, and entered the field in the second half of the goalless draw with the latter as Romania finished third in its group.

Moruțan earned his first cap for the full side on 11 October 2021, coming on for goal scorer Alexandru Mitriță in a 1–0 success over Armenia in the 2022 FIFA World Cup qualifiers.

Style of play
Moruțan is capable of playing in several advanced midfield positions, and during his time at Botoșani was regarded by former international Dan Petrescu as Romania's future number 10.

Career statistics

Club

International

Scores and results list Romania's goal tally first, score column indicates score after each Moruțan goal.

Honours
FCSB
Cupa României: 2019–20
Supercupa României runner-up: 2020

Individual
Liga I Team of the Season: 2020–21

References

External links

FCSB official profile 

1999 births
Living people
Sportspeople from Cluj-Napoca
Romanian footballers
Association football midfielders
Liga I players
Liga II players
FC Universitatea Cluj players
FC Botoșani players
FC Steaua București players
Süper Lig players
Galatasaray S.K. footballers
Serie B players
Pisa S.C. players
Romania youth international footballers
Romania under-21 international footballers
Romania international footballers
Romanian expatriate footballers
Expatriate footballers in Turkey
Expatriate footballers in Italy
Romanian expatriate sportspeople in Turkey
Romanian expatriate sportspeople in Italy